Moolgarda is a genus of mugilid mullets found in coastal waters of the Indo-Pacific, including estuaries and rivers.

Species
The type species, Moolgarda pura, may be a synonym of Crenimugil buchanani (the bluetail mullet). If so, Moolgarda is a junior synonym of Crenimugil. Whitley also considered the thinlip mullet the closest relative of Moolgarda pura. Another species included in this genus is the longfin mullet (Moolgarda pedaraki), FishBase classifies this species within the genus Crenimugil rather than in Mooldgarda, which if correct makes Moolgardia a synonym of that genus.

References

Mugilidae
Ray-finned fish genera